Bernheimer is an unincorporated community in Warren County, in the U.S. state of Missouri.

History
A post office called Bernheimer was established in 1893, closed temporarily in 1895, reopened in 1897, and was discontinued in 1945. The community has the name of Joseph Bernheimer, a St. Louis capitalist.

The Katy Trail, a 225-mile long bike path, passes through Bernheimer.

References

Unincorporated communities in Warren County, Missouri
Unincorporated communities in Missouri